Lambung Mangkurat University is a public university in Banjarmasin and Banjarbaru, South Kalimantan, Indonesia. It is established on September 1, 1958. Its current rector is Prof. Dr. Ahmad Alim Bachri. It is named after Lambung Mangkurat, the first Negara Dipa's patih (prime minister).

Schools 
The university has 10 faculties.

Banjarmasin campus
 Faculty of Education
 Faculty of Law
 Faculty of Economics
 Faculty of Social and Politics Sciences
 Faculty of Medicine (Departments of Medicine and Dentistry)
 Department of Architecture (under Faculty of Engineering)

Banjarbaru campus
 Faculty of Social and Political Sciences
 Faculty of Engineering (all departments except Architecture)
 Faculty of Agriculture
 Faculty of Forestry
 Faculty of Fishery
 Faculty of Medicine (Departments of Psychology, Public Health and Nursery)
 Faculty of Mathematics and Natural Sciences

Since 2011, the Department of Medicine and Dentistry (Faculty of Medicine) has been moved to a new campus in Banjarmasin, adjacent to Duta Mall.

See also
List of forestry universities and colleges

External links

 Official site

Banjarmasin
Banjarbaru
South Kalimantan
Buildings and structures in Banjarmasin
Buildings and structures in South Kalimantan
Universities in Indonesia
Educational institutions established in 1958
Universities in South Kalimantan
Indonesian state universities
1958 establishments in Indonesia